Hermann Friedrich Krummacher (1828-1890) was a German author and government official.  He was the son of Emil Wilhelm Krummacher.  He was appointed Consistorialrath in Stettin in 1877. He was the author of Deutsches Leben in Nordamerika (German life in North America, 1874).

Notes

References
 

1828 births
1890 deaths
German non-fiction writers
German male non-fiction writers